The United States Capitol displays public artworks by a variety of artists, including the National Statuary Hall Collection and United States Senate Vice Presidential Bust Collection.

Paintings

Sculpture
Sculptures include those within the National Statuary Hall Collection and United States Senate Vice Presidential Bust Collection. Other sculptures include a bust of Martin Luther King Jr., the Columbus Doors, and the Revolutionary War Door.

National Statuary Hall Collection 

The National Statuary Hall Collection is composed of statues donated by individual U.S. states to honor persons notable in their history. Limited to two statues per state, the collection was originally set up in the old Hall of the House of Representatives, which was then renamed National Statuary Hall. The expanding collection has since been spread throughout the Capitol and its Visitor Center.

Other portrait sculpture 
Other sculptures under the control of the Architect of the Capitol include the following:

Allegorical or mythological sculpture

See also
 Art in the White House

References

External links

 
 

Public art in Washington, D.C.